Brasilândia do Sul is a municipality in the state of Paraná in the Southern Region of Brazil.  Its estimated population in 2020 was 2,585.

See also
List of municipalities in Paraná

References

Municipalities in Paraná